This is a list of notable Pakistani models.

Female models

 Annie Ali Khan
 Anzhelika Tahir
 Ainy Jaffri
 Amna Ilyas
 Amina Haq
 Anoushay Abbasi
 Arij Fatyma
 Ayesha Omar
 Ayyan
 Farah Shah
 Iffat Rahim
 Iman Ali
 Iqra Aziz
 Juggan Kazim
 Mariyah Moten
 Mathira
 Mawra Hocane
 Maya Ali
 Meera
 Meesha Shafi
 Mehreen Raheel
 Mehwish Hayat
 Momal Sheikh
 Nadia Hussain
 Neelam Muneer
 Nida Yasir
 Noor
 Rabia Butt
 Reema Khan
 Rubya Chaudhry
 Saba Qamar
 Sadia Imam
 Sana Nawaz
 Sana Askari
 Sanam Saeed
 Sonia Ahmed
 Sumbul Iqbal
 Tooba Siddiqui
 Urwa Hocane
 Vaneeza Ahmad
 Veena Malik
 Yasmeen Ghauri
 Yumna Zaidi
 Zara Abid
 Zara Sheikh
 Zainab Qayyum
 Zeba Ali
 Zhalay Sarhadi

Male models

 Abbas Jafri
 Aijaz Aslam
 Azfar Rehman
 Emmad Irfani
 Fahad Mustafa
 Hasnain Lehri
 Jahan-e-Khalid
 Junaid Khan
 Noman Ejaz
 Omer Shahzad
 Rizwan Ali Jaffri
 Shahzad Noor
 Shehzad Sheikh

Models
Pakistan